The 2019 Macau Guia Race was the fourth edition of the Macau Guia Race under the TCR Regulations held at Guia Circuit in Macau on 13–17 November 2020. The race was contested with TCR touring cars and run in support of the 2019 Macau Grand Prix. The race served as the penultimate round of the 2019 World Touring Car Cup.

Teams and drivers
The following teams and drivers are entered into the event:

Results

Qualifying

References

External links
 World Touring Car Cup Official website
 Macau Grand Prix Official website

World Touring Car Cup
World Touring Car Cup
World Touring Car Cup